Andrew Johanessen Anderson (November 14, 1837 – January 17, 1916) was a member of the Wisconsin State Assembly.

Anderson was born in Lyngstad in the municipality of Gran, Norway. He settled with his parents in Argyle, Wisconsin in 1851. There he became involved in business and farming. He married Lucinda A. Million (1841–1924) in 1862, and they had four children. He died in Neligh, Nebraska in 1916.

Political career
Anderson was a member of the Assembly during the 1877 session. Other positions he held include chairman (similar to mayor) and town clerk of Argyle. He was a Republican.

References

External links

Norwegian emigrants to the United States
People from Argyle, Wisconsin
Republican Party members of the Wisconsin State Assembly
Mayors of places in Wisconsin
City and town clerks
Businesspeople from Wisconsin
Farmers from Wisconsin
1837 births
1916 deaths